Jarrod Ian Englefield (born 18 December 1979 in  Blenheim in Marlborough, New Zealand) is a New Zealand cricketer. He captained New Zealand in three Under-19 Tests against England in 1998/9, winning one and losing one. He is a right-handed batsmen, who has since played first-class, List A and Twenty20 cricket for Central Districts and Canterbury, but has not played for the senior New Zealand team.

References
Cricinfo page on Jarrod Englefield

1979 births
Living people
New Zealand cricketers
Canterbury cricketers
Central Districts cricketers
New Zealand Youth One Day International captains
New Zealand Youth Test captains
South Island cricketers